Harry Hudson was a professional rugby league footballer who played in the 1920s and 1930s. He played at club level for Castleford (Heritage №).

Playing career

County League appearances
Harry Hudson played in Castleford's victory in the Yorkshire County League during the 1932–33 season.

Club career
Harry Hudson made his début for Castleford in the 0-22 defeat by Hull F.C. on Saturday 28 August 1926.

References

External links
Search for "Hudson" at rugbyleagueproject.org
Harry Hudson Memory Box Search at archive.castigersheritage.com

Castleford Tigers players
English rugby league players
Place of birth missing
Place of death missing
Year of birth missing
Year of death missing